Scoparia biradiellus is a moth in the family Crambidae. It was described by Paul Mabille in 1885. It is found in Chile.

The wingspan is 24–25 mm. The forewings are violet light grey.

References

Moths described in 1885
Scorparia
Endemic fauna of Chile